Lake Joe, also known as East Oakwood Drive Lake, is located about two miles southeast of Avon Park, Florida, and about  north of Sebring, Florida.  It is bounded on three sides by citrus orchards and on the south by a wooded area and a set of railroad tracks.

Lake Joe has a  surface area and is almost round in shape.  This lake is surrounded by private property, so no public fishing, boating or swimming is allowed.

References

Joe
Joe